Aaron Christopher Bird is an Australian cricketer who played first-class cricket for the New South Wales Blues. He is a right-handed batsman and a right-arm fast bowler.

Bird arrived from Taree, NSW as a 16-year-old to play Sydney Grade Cricket with North Sydney Cricket Club, eventually going on to play First Grade as an 18-year-old. In this time with North Sydney, Bird hit the headlines when he hit former Test batsman Michael Slater injuring the former test star in the process. Bird now plays his cricket with Bankstown Cricket Club, former home of the Waugh brothers.

Bird caused controversy after appearing in a Twenty20 match, in which players wore nicknames on their shirts, with the moniker 'Flu' – a reference to bird flu. He was ordered not to wear the name again, as might upset the sponsors of the tournament, KFC.

In December 2006 Bird was reported for a suspect bowling action but was later cleared by Cricket Australia. In January 2009, his bowling action was again reported. After undergoing analysis at the Australian Institute of Sport biomechanics laboratory in Canberra it was found that for some deliveries his elbow extension exceeded the 15-degree limit, he was subsequently banned by Cricket Australia. After being mentioned by the umpires in a Blues' Twenty20 match in January 2010, Bird ended his first-class career in April 2010; he would continue to play grade cricket for Canterbury-Bankstown.

See also
 List of New South Wales representative cricketers

References

External links

  

1983 births
Australian cricketers
Cricketers from New South Wales
Living people
New South Wales cricketers
People from Taree